Algoriella is a Gram-negative, aerobic, non-spore-forming and psychrotolerant genus of bacteria from the family of Weeksellaceae with on know species Algoriella xinjiangensis. Algoriella xinjiangensis has been isolated from sewage water from the Xinjiang Uighur Autonomous Region.

References

Flavobacteria
Bacteria genera
Taxa described in 2016
Monotypic bacteria genera